Coptodisca ostryaefoliella is a moth of the family Heliozelidae. It was described by James Brackenridge Clemens in 1861. It is found in North America, including Ohio.

References

Moths described in 1861
Heliozelidae